The Journal Tribune (and York County Weekend) was a daily newspaper published in Biddeford, Maine, United States, circulated throughout the greater York County, Maine region.

In 2003, the Saturday morning edition of the Journal Tribune was renamed "York County Weekend."

In 2013, the Sunday edition of the Journal Tribune was launched. Nearly 25,000 editions were delivered every Sunday to residents throughout York County. The free Sunday edition ended with the Oct. 28, 2018 edition.

In 2017, the newspaper discontinued its Monday printed edition, instead publishing an online-only edition for that day.

Reade Brower, owner of MaineToday Media, acquired the Journal Tribune and the Times Record of Brunswick on April 1, 2018, from the Sample News Group, which then acquired Brower's newspapers in Rutland and Montpelier, Vermont.

Starting with the Saturday, Nov. 3, 2018 edition, the Journal Tribune's "Weekender" edition was expanded. Columnists appearing in the free Sunday edition were moved to Saturdays. The newspaper also added a "Scoreboard Page" and "Outdoors Page" for Sports. The newspaper's "Food Page" was expanded to two pages and a new "Books Page" and "Life Page" were created. The "Religion Page" which typically has appeared in Friday's Journal Tribune also was moved to the "Weekender" edition.

With the elimination of the free Sunday edition, the newspaper also created an online-only edition for that day.

In 2019, the Journal Tribune was closed.

Regular Features

Opinion Page: Commentary from prominent local, state and national newsmakers

Police Logs: A roundup of arrests and summons issued by area police departments.

Life Page: A Saturday page devoted to the world around us and in-depth feature articles.

Books Page: A Saturday page devoted to all things books including reviews and Best Seller lists.

Readers Forum: Reader Letters

Outdoors Page: A Saturday page focusing on fishing, hunting and outdoor recreational activities in Maine.

Community Page: Articles and photos impacting and celebrating residents of York County

Football Friday: An in-depth seasonal look at high school football games

Classifieds: A local bulletin board

References

External links
 Official website

Journal Tribune
Journal Tribune
York County, Maine
Biddeford, Maine